The 2014 FC Ordabasy season was the 12th season back in the Kazakhstan Premier League, the highest tier of association football in Kazakhstan, following their promotion from to the Kazakhstan First Division in 2003. Ordabasy finished the season in 4th place, qualifying for the UEFA Europa League on goal difference. Ordabasy also reached the Second Round of the Kazakhstan Cup where they were knocked out by Taraz.

Saulius Širmelis was appointed the club's manager on 3 April.

Squad

Transfers

Winter

In:

Out:

Summer

In:

Out:

Competitions

Kazakhstan Premier League

First round

Results

League table

Championship Round

Results summary

Results by round

Results

Table

Kazakhstan Cup

Squad statistics

Appearances and goals

|-
|colspan="14"|Players who left Ordabasy on loan during the season:

|-
|colspan="14"|Players who appeared for Ordabasy that left during the season:

|}

Goal scorers

Disciplinary record

References

Ordabasy
FC Ordabasy seasons